This is a list of Norwegian television related events from 2008.

Events
9 May - 16-year-old singer Erlend Bratland wins the first series of Norske Talenter.
14 November - Singer Lene Alexandra Øien and her partner Tom-Erik Nilsen win the fourth series of Skal vi danse?.

Debuts

22 February - Norske Talenter (2008–present)

Television shows

2000s
Skal vi danse? (2006–present)

Ending this year

Births

Deaths

See also
2008 in Norway